The Women's pentathlon competition at the 1976 Summer Olympics in Montreal was held on 25–26 July. After four of the five events, with only the 200 metres remaining, the top 8 of the 19 competitors were separated by less than 100 points:

 Nadiya Tkachenko - 3788
 Lyudmila Popovskaya - 3772
 Burglinde Pollak - 3768
 Diane Jones - 3764
 Christine Laser - 3757
 Margit Papp - 3726
 Siegrun Siegl - 3718
 Jane Frederick - 3693

All of the leaders were matched against each other in the final heat. After the point scoring was calculated, Siegl and Laser had finished =1st with 4745 points, with Pollak 3rd with 4740 points. Siegl was awarded the gold medal on the basis of having scored more points than Laser in three of the five events (100 metres hurdles, long jump and 200 metres). Had Pollak run the 200 metres in 23.58 instead of 23.64, then she would have won the gold medal. While Siegl jumped from seventh to first in one event, Tkachenko had the misfortune of dropping from first to fifth in less than 25 seconds. She would go on to lead the Soviet podium sweep four years later in Moscow.

Results

References

External links
 Official report
 1976 Summer Olympics – Women's pentathlon Highlights

Pentathlon
1976
1976 in women's athletics
Women's events at the 1976 Summer Olympics